Ecto-ADP-ribosyltransferase 4 is an enzyme that in humans is encoded by the ART4 gene. ART4 has also been designated as CD297 (cluster of differentiation 297).

Function 

This gene encodes a protein that contains a mono-ADP-ribosylation (ART) motif. It is a member of the ADP-ribosyltransferase gene family but enzymatic activity has not been demonstrated experimentally. Antigens of the Dombrock blood group system are located on the gene product, which is glycosylphosphatidylinositol-anchored to the erythrocyte membrane. Allelic variants, some of which lead to adverse transfusion reactions, are known.

Blood group antigens 

Several antigens have been recognised in this family. These are DO*A, DO*JO1, DO*A-WL, DO*DOYA, DO*B, DO*B-WL, DO*B-SH-Q149K, DO*B-(WL)-I175N, DO*HY1, DO*HY2 and DO*DOMR.

Model organisms
Model organisms have been used in the study of ART4 function. A conditional knockout mouse line called Art4tm1a(KOMP)Wtsi was generated at the Wellcome Trust Sanger Institute. Male and female animals underwent a standardized phenotypic screen to determine the effects of deletion. Additional screens performed:  - In-depth immunological phenotyping - in-depth bone and cartilage phenotyping

References

Further reading

External links 
 
 
 
 Dombrock blood group antigen NCBI Blood Group Antigen Gene Mutation Database

Clusters of differentiation

Blood antigen systems